It has been estimated that between 12,000  and 20,000 Chinese-American men, representing up to 22 percent of the men in their portion of the U.S. population, served during World War II.  Unlike Japanese and Filipino Americans, 75 percent served in non-segregated units.  Chinese Americans distinguished themselves from Japanese Americans, and suffered less discrimination.

Service
A quarter of those would serve in the U.S. Army Air Forces, some of them were sent to the Chinese-Burma-India theater for service with the 14th Air Service Group and the Chinese-American Composite Wing.  Another 70 percent would go on to serve in the U.S. Army in various units, including the 3rd, 4th, 6th, 32nd and 77th Infantry Divisions.  Prior to the war, the U.S. Navy had recruited Chinese Americans but they had been restricted to serve only as stewards; this continued until May 1942, when restrictions ceased and they were allowed to serve in other ratings. In 1943, Chinese-American women were accepted into the Women's Army Corps in the Military Intelligence Service. They were also recruited for service in the Army Air Force, with a few later becoming civilian Women Airforce Service Pilots.

Recognition
Captain Francis Wai of the 34th Infantry was posthumously awarded the Distinguished Service Cross for actions on the island of Leyte in late 1944; this awarding was later elevated to a Medal of Honor in the 2000 review. Wilbur Carl Sze became the first Chinese-American officer commissioned in the Marine Corps.

Congressional Gold Medal
On May 4, 2017, Senators Tammy Duckworth, Thad Cochran and Mazie Hirono introduced S.1050 Chinese-American World War II Veteran Congressional Gold Medal Act and Representatives Ed Royce and Ted Lieu introduced a companion bill H.R.2358. Efforts to pass the bill were led by the Chinese American WWII Veterans Recognition Project. The bill was passed in the Senate on September 12, 2018, and in the House on December 12, 2018. President Donald Trump signed the bill, enacting it into law on December 20, 2018.

See also
List of Japanese American Servicemen and Servicewomen in World War II
Lost Battalion (World War II)
Day of Remembrance (Japanese Americans)
Military history of Asian Americans

References

External links

Chinese-American history
American military personnel of Chinese descent
United_States_Army_Air_Forces_soldiers
American military personnel of World War II